"John Forrester Awaits the Light" is the eighth television play episode of the second season of the Australian anthology television series Australian Playhouse. "John Forrester Awaits the Light" originally aired on ABC on 11 September 1967 in Sydney.

Plot
An ambitious young businessman (Peter Whitford) believes he should test his potential with women but Vera doesn't react to his overtures.

Cast
 Peter Whitford
 June Thody as Vera
 Hugh Scott

Production
It was the first of three plays by Michael Boddy done by Australian Playhouse. It was filmed in Sydney.

Reception
The Sydney Morning Herald said it "falls short on audience involvement."

References

External links
 
 
 

1967 television plays
1967 Australian television episodes
1960s Australian television plays
Australian Playhouse (season 2) episodes